The Triodion is a 13th or 14th century Georgian manuscript housed in the (National Archives of Georgia. It is known technically as fond #1446, manuscript #322. The work has 41 pages made of parchment, with printing in black ink composed of angular Nuskhuri script. Its dimensions are 220 mm x 142 mm.

All pages of the manuscript are palimpsests; the lower layer of the text is Armenian, and represents an Armenian translation of the lectionary; the palimpsest text is written vertically in relation to the upper layer of the text. Two upper pages of the Georgian text form one page of the lower Armenian text. The Terminus ante quem for the Armenian manuscript is the 9th or 10th century. The Armenian translation of the lectionary, together with the Georgian and Albanian translations, has preserved an account of the oldest, Jerusalem liturgical practice.

Literature
The UNESCO Memory of the World Register. The Manuscripts Preserved in the National Archives of Georgia. Editor/compiler Ketevan Asatiani. Tbilisi. 2016

References
UNESCO site

Georgian manuscripts